Clark O.N.T., was a U.S. soccer team sponsored by the Clark Thread Company.  The team competed in the annual American Cup, winning the first three championships. Beside Fall River Rovers, they are considered the most successful clubs in the late 1880s in American soccer.

History

Name
Established November 15, 1883 at a meeting of 150 employees, the first president and vice-president elected were Campbell Clark and William Clark Jr. respectively.  The Clark Thread Company originally named its soccer team Clark Our New Thread (Clark O.N.T.) as part of a marketing campaign introducing a new product.  As the product became established, the company renamed its athletic team to the simpler Clark A.A.  While the Clark Thread Company factory was originally located in Newark, on the west bank of the Passaic River, the team played at Clark Field located on the east side of the river, an area known as East Newark.

Competition
The team began play in February 1884 and later won the first American Cup which kicked off in late October of that year.  It went on to win the next two cup championships, giving it the right to call itself the first U.S. soccer dynasty. Their second title followed a successful baseball campaign in which they won the Essex League championship. The cricket season was much less successful however, finishing with a record of 2 wins and 9 losses with 2 draws.

National team
Besides its league and cup records, Clark O.N.T. had a part in the first two, now unofficial, U.S. international games.  The American Football Association sponsored two games with the Canadian national team in 1885.  On November 28, 1885, Clark contributed both its field and five of its players to the game, won by Canada. The referee was also provided by O.N.T.

Year-by-year

Honors
American Cup
 Winner (3): 1885, 1886, 1887

References

Defunct soccer clubs in New Jersey
National Association Football League teams
Sports in Hudson County, New Jersey
1883 establishments in New Jersey
Association football clubs established in 1883
Works soccer clubs in the United States